Gmina Rzgów may refer to either of the following administrative districts in Poland:
Gmina Rzgów, Greater Poland Voivodeship
Gmina Rzgów, Łódź Voivodeship